Heick is a surname. Notable people with the surname include:

Annette Heick (born 1971), Danish television personality, journalist, singer and voice actress
Keld Heick (born 1946), Danish singer-songwriter and musician
William Heick (born 1916), American photographer and film director